Jaca  (in Aragonese: Chaca or Xaca) is a city of northeastern Spain in the province of Huesca, located near the Pyrenees and the border with France. Jaca is an ancient fort on the Aragón River, situated at the crossing of two great early medieval routes, one from Toulousse to Santiago de Compostela and Pau to Zaragoza. Jaca was the city out of which the County and Kingdom of Aragon developed. It was the capital of Aragon until 1097 and also the capital of Jacetania.

Villages
Besides Jaca town, there are a number of outlying villages in Jaca's municipality, including the ski resort of Astún.

History
The origins of the city are obscure, but its name is apparently of Iacetani origin, mentioned by Strabo as one of the most celebrated of the numerous small tribes inhabiting the Ebro basin. Strabo adds that their territory lay on the site of the wars in the 1st century BC between Sertorius and Pompey. According to the atlas of the ancient Greek and Roman worlds Jaca was a town where minted coins were made  from the second half of the 2nd century BC, a small number of which are now in the British Museum. The coins show an unidentified bearded head to the right with an inscription to the left and also have an image of a dolphin. The reverse side depicts a horseman carrying a spear to the right, with an inscription below in Iberian reading iaka.

It is unknown when the town was reconquered. Ramiro I of Aragon (1035–1063) granted it the title of City. In 1063 it was the site of the Synod of Jaca.

On December 12–13 1930 the Jaca uprising, a mutiny whose leaders demanded abolition of the monarchy, was suppressed with some difficulty. It was an early event that preceded the Spanish Civil War.

Climate

Winters are cool and summers are warm, with hot daytime temperatures but relatively cool nights. There isn't any real dry season, but the rainiest seasons are autumn and spring. Frost is common so is snowfall, being snow common from late November to early March. Heavy snowfalls are sporadic, and they usually occur during cold spells.

Main sights
Jaca boasts several medieval walls and towers surrounding the 11th-century Romanesque Jaca Cathedral.

The Jaca citadel, a fortification dating to the late 16th century, is home to a colony of rock sparrows.

The Diocesan Museum of Jaca (Museum of Medieval Sacred Art) protects Romanesque and Gothic frescos, some of which were found in the most remote locations in the Jaca district.

Tourism and sports

Jaca is a tourist destination in the region for summer holidays and winter sports.

Starting in the early 1970s, the city was transformed from being a small provincial and garrison town to become the gateway to a mid-tier mountain sports area with two major winter resorts (Valle de Astun and Candanchu) within a 30 km drive of the city.

The accompanying urban and infrastructure development in the 1970s and 1980s was controversial, with many claiming that the town lost a lot of its original charm and authenticity to the interests of developers.

The development experienced by the city, with the construction of a nationally known ice-skating rink (the Pista de Hielo del Pirineo), a small convention centre (the Palacio de Congresos) and countless second residences had a profound impact on the economy of the Valley (Valle del Aragon), where many of its inhabitants evolved from small-scale subsistence farmera in Jaca and the surrounding villages, to become part of a tertiary economy.

Jaca was the host city of the 1981 and 1995 Winter Universiades. The city also hosted the 2007 European Youth Olympic Winter Festival. Its popularity for winter sports has been a motivating factor in the city's failed bids for the 1998 Winter Olympics, 2002 Winter Olympics and 2010 Winter Olympics, which were awarded to Nagano, Salt Lake City and Vancouver. It was again the applicant city of Spain for the 2014 Winter Olympics, but the bid failed again when it was not selected as a candidate city and the games were ultimately awarded to Sochi.

Gallery

See also
 Diocese of Jaca
 Ascara
 Castiello de Jaca

References

External links

 Official website 
 Diocesan Museum of Jaca
 Jaca: Useful information about tourism and lodgings

Municipalities in the Province of Huesca
Pyrenees
Cultural tourism in Spain

Хака